Detlef Blasche (born 23 October 1955) is a German weightlifter. He competed in the men's light heavyweight event at the 1980 Summer Olympics.

References

1955 births
Living people
German male weightlifters
Olympic weightlifters of East Germany
Weightlifters at the 1980 Summer Olympics
Sportspeople from Frankfurt